Conejo Valley Adult Education (CVAE) is a public California Adult School in Thousand Oaks, California, part of the Conejo Valley Unified School District. It is the only adult education campus in the district.  The school's principal is Mike Sanders.  The school is accredited by the Western Association of Schools and Colleges (WASC), the accrediting body for schools and colleges in the Western United States and territories.

Programs offered

 Computer Certificate Programs & Courses
 Medical Certificate Programs & Courses, including Phlebotomy Technician, Pharmacy Technician, Physical Therapy Aide, Certified Caregiver, EKG Technician, Electronic Medical Records
 High School Equivalency Preparation 
 Adult and Concurrent High School Diploma Programs
 Bridge Program (to transition to community college or vocational training)
 SAT & ACT Prep
 ESL Programs
 Literacy Program
 Parent Education Program
 Senior Adult Enrichment Classes (e.g., drawing, painting, needlework, Spanish, dance, yoga)
 Community Enrichment classes (e.g., career development and exploration, finance, fine arts, foreign language, home & garden, dance & music, writing, fitness & sport, food & nutrition)

References

Western Association of Schools and Colleges (WASC)

External links
 Official website: 
 Facebook page: 
 Directory of public California Adult Schools: 

Education in Thousand Oaks, California
Conejo Valley Unified School District
California Adult Schools
Education in Ventura County, California
Public schools in California